Joshua Tobias Bowman (born 4 March 1988) is an English actor best known for his role as Daniel Grayson in ABC's Revenge.

Early life
Bowman was born in Berkshire on 4 March 1988. He was educated at the Wellington College boarding school. His sister, Scarlett Bowman, is a former Hollyoaks star. Bowman states that his father is Jewish, and said in the interview that he "feels Jewish, ish." Bowman's other ancestry is English, Irish, and distant Italian.

At the age of 18, Bowman was briefly a professional rugby player for Saracens F.C., before suffering two shoulder dislocations in his first year and being asked to leave.

Career
Bowman made his acting debut in 2007 playing Dimitri in the TV series Genie in the House. He then spent two years on the British series Holby City and went on to appear in the films 13Hrs, Prowl, Exteriors and Love’s Kitchen. In 2011, he joined the ABC Family show Make It or Break It, playing a gymnast named Max Spencer. 

In 2011 he was selected as one of the Stars of Tomorrow by Screen International. Bowman played Daniel Grayson, a series regular, in the ABC series Revenge. Bowman starred in the ABC series Time After Time, about the adventures of a young H. G. Wells; it was cancelled in 2017.

Bowman studied method acting at the Lee Strasberg Institute in New York.

Bowman played Krasko in the Doctor Who episode "Rosa".

Personal life
Bowman began dating his Revenge co-star Emily VanCamp in late 2011. The couple became engaged on 11 May 2017 and married on 15 December 2018 in The Bahamas. The couple announced the birth of their first child, daughter Iris, in August 2021.

Filmography

References

External links
 

1988 births
21st-century English male actors
Actors Studio alumni
British expatriate male actors in the United States
English expatriates in the United States
English male film actors
English male television actors
English people of Irish descent
English people of Italian descent
Jewish English male actors
Living people
Male actors from Berkshire
People educated at Wellington College, Berkshire
People from the Royal Borough of Windsor and Maidenhead